From Playground 'til Now was the debut release of Some Velvet Sidewalk.

Track listing
"Old Bridges"
"Jean Waits"
"all right."
"Big Orange"
"Playground 'til Now"
"Old Bridges"
"real cool time, again."
"worried man backdrop rock"
"cool it down, revisited."

Credits
Al Larsen - vocals/guitar
Robert Christie - drums

Also credited for music: Mike, Laura, Ellen, Bill, and John.

Back cover reads:
why this tape sounds the way it does.although it could be argued that the tape sounds this way because I'm dumb, I would prefer you think it's because rooms, recording tape and tape machines are not invisible.-- Al.

Some Velvet Sidewalk albums
1988 albums